Martin Paul Meredith Richards (born 26 January 1940) is a British psychologist, Professor of Family Research at the University of Cambridge 1997–2005, and since emeritus.

Richards is the son of the botanist Paul Westmacott Richards.

Academic career 
Apart from visiting positions elsewhere, he has worked in the University of Cambridge throughout his career, holding a lectureship in social and developmental psychology (1970) and subsequently a readership (human development, 1989) and a personal chair (family research, 1997). The research group he founded in 1967 became the Centre for Family Research and he was director until his formal retirement in 2005. His research, which he always preferred to do in collaboration with others, has ranged widely, from his initial observational follow up study of infants and their parents to studies of neonatal and maternity care to divorce and parenting. Later he studied those affected by genetic disorders as well as their families and the clinics they attended. Additionally, he conducted research on reproductive donation. He always worked with an eye on public policy and, more latterly, with bioethical issues. He was a co-founder of the initially Cambridge based Socio Legal Group and frequently served as a co-editor of their collective books.

He has served on many public bodies including the Human Genetic Commission, the Nuffield Council on Bioethics, the Ethics and Law Committee of the Human Fertilisation and Embryology Authority and as a policy advisor for the Lord Chancellor's Department.

Publications 

Books include:

 The Integration of a Child into a Social World (editor). Cambridge University Press. 1974.
 The Benefits of Hazards of the New Obstetrics (editor with T. Chard). Clinics in Developmental Medicine. 1977.
 Infancy. The World of the Newborn. Harper and Row. 1980.
 Divorce matters. (with J. Burgoyne and R. Ormrod). Penguin Books. 1987.
 The Politics of Maternity Care. (editor with J. Garcia and R. Kilpatrick). Oxford University Press. 1990.
 Sexual Arrangements: Marriage and Affairs. (with J. Reibstein). Heineman. 1992.
 The Troubled Helix: Social and Psychological Implications of the New Human Genetics. (editor with T. Marteau). Cambridge University Press. 1996.
 The Blackwell Companion to the Sociology of Families. (edited with J. Scott and J. Treas). Blackwell. 2003.
 Kinship Matters. (editor with F. Ebtehaj and B. Lindley). Hart. 2006.
 The Limits of Consent: A Socio-Ethical Approach to Human Subject Research in Medicine. (editor with O. Corrigan and others). Oxford University Press. 2009.
 Reproductive Donation: Practice, Policy and Bioethics. (ethics with G. Pennings and J. Appleby). Cambridge University Press. 2012.
 Relatedness in Assisted Reproduction: Families, Origins and Identities. (editor with T. Freeman, S. Graham, F. Ebtehaj). Cambridge University Press. 2014.

References

External links 

 

1940 births
Living people
British psychologists
Academics of the University of Cambridge